William Davis Snodgrass (30 June, 1796 – 28 May, 1885) was an American Presbyterian clergyman.

Snodgrass was born in West Hanover, Pennsylvania. He was the son of the Reverend James Snodgrass, who from 1784 until his death in 1846 was pastor of the Presbyterian church in West Hanover. After graduation at Washington College, Pennsylvania, in 1815, and at Princeton Theological Seminary in 1818, he held Presbyterian pastorates in the south till 1823, when he was called to New York City. From 1834 till 1844 he was pastor of a Presbyterian church in Troy, New York, after which he established the Fifteenth Street Church in New York City, serving as its pastor in 1846-'9. From 1849 until his death he was pastor in Goshen, New York In 1830 he became a director of Princeton Theological Seminary, and he was president of its board of trustees in 1868. Columbia gave him the degree of D.D. in 1830. He published a discourse on the death of Reverend John M. Mason (New York, 1830), Perfectionism, Lectures on Apostolic Succession (1844), and several other discourses. He died in Goshen, New York.

1796 births
1885 deaths
Presbyterian ministers
Princeton Theological Seminary faculty
Princeton Theological Seminary alumni
People from Dauphin County, Pennsylvania